Kim Tae-su (born 25 August 1981) is a South Korean football midfielder who plays for FC Anyang.

He transferred from Chunnam Dragons on 28 January 2009.

Honours

Chunnam Dragons
KFA Cup
Winner (2): 2006, 2007
League Cup
Runner-up: 2008

Pohang Steelers
K League Classic
Winner: 2013
KFA Cup
Winner: 2012, 2013
League Cup
Winner: 2009
AFC Champions League
Winner: 2009

Club career statistics

References

External links
 

1981 births
Living people
South Korean footballers
Association football midfielders
Jeonnam Dragons players
Pohang Steelers players
Incheon United FC players
K League 1 players
Seoul E-Land FC players
FC Anyang players
K League 2 players